Dr. Sue J. Goldie (born 1961) is the Roger Irving Lee Professor of Public Health, the Director of the Center for Health Decision Science (Harvard T. H. Chan School of Public Health), Director of the Global Health Education and Learning Incubator at Harvard University, and founding Faculty Director of the Harvard Global Health Institute (Harvard University).  
Dr. Goldie has a secondary appointment as Professor of Global Health and Social Medicine (Harvard Medical School). 
Her professional agenda includes improving women's health in all parts of the world, using evidence-based policy to reduce global health inequities, building bridges between disciplines to tackle critical public health challenges, and fostering innovation in education.

Life
Dr. Goldie attended Union College (1984), Albany Medical College (1988), completed her internship and residency at Yale New Haven Hospital, Yale University School of Medicine (1988-1991), and earned her MPH from the Harvard School of Public Health (1997) where she was also a recipient of a fellowship award from the Agency for Health Care Research and Quality (1995-1997).

Personal interests include martial arts (Tae Kwon Do), skiing, climbing, and training her two golden retrievers. Her partner is Aaron B. Waxman, MD, PhD; they have two sons.

Career
Trained as a physician, decision scientist, and public health researcher, Dr. Goldie's decision analytic work has focused on viruses of global health importance, vaccine-preventable diseases, and maternal mortality. Dr. Goldie has published more than 150 original research papers and 50 chapters, reports, and technical notes, and has been Principal Investigator on awards from the National Institutes of Health, National Cancer Institute, Centers for Disease Control and Prevention, Bill and Melinda Gates Foundation, Doris Duke Foundation, and MacArthur Foundation. 
She has served on the Board on Global Health for the Institute of Medicine and several technical advisory boards for the World Health Organization. She was awarded a MacArthur grant "for genius and creativity" in applying the tools of decision science to combat major public health problems (2005-2010), and was elected to the Institute of Medicine, National Academy of Sciences (2009).

Dr. Goldie has received numerous teaching and mentorship awards, including the Harvard School of Public Health mentoring award and the Everett Mendelsohn Excellence in Mentoring Award from Harvard University. She teaches RDS 280 (Decision Science for Public Health) at the School of Public Health and SW24 (Global Health Challenges: Complexity of Evidence-based Policy) at the College.  She serves on the Standing Committee on Health Policy and is actively involved with the university-wide PhD program in health policy.

Awards
 2010 Alpha Omega Alpha Honor Medical Society Visiting Professorship
 2009 John Eisenberg Award 
 2009 Elected to the Institute of Medicine, National Academy of Sciences 
 2008 Roger Irving Lee Endowed Chair, Harvard School of Public Health 
 2005 MacArthur Fellows Program
 2005 Distinguished Alumni Award, Albany Medical College

References

External links
Center for Health Decision Science, Harvard School of Public Health
"Sue J. Goldie", Scientific Commons

1962 births
Union College (New York) alumni
Albany Medical College alumni
Harvard School of Public Health alumni
Harvard School of Public Health faculty
Harvard University faculty
MacArthur Fellows
Living people
Harvard Medical School faculty
Members of the National Academy of Medicine